Surveyor Lake is a lake in Algoma District, Ontario, Canada, about  northwest of the community of Espanola.

Hydrology
There are four unnamed creek inflows. The primary outflow, at the northeast, is Cee Creek, which flows into the Wakonassin River, then via the Spanish River into the North Channel of Lake Huron.

See also
List of lakes in Ontario

References

Lakes of Algoma District